Galluzzi is a surname most prevalent in the Italian regions Tuscany, Lombardy and Apulia. In Tuscany a toponymic origin of the name (Galluzzo south of Florence) is suggested.

Notable people with the surname include:

 Carlo Alberto Galluzzi (1919–2000), Italian politician
 Giuseppe Galluzzi (1903–19??), Italian footballer
 Maria Domitilla Galluzzi (1595–1671), Catholic mystic
 Miguel Angel Galluzzi (born 1959), Argentine industrial designer
 Paolo Galluzzi (born 1942), Italian historian of science

References

Italian-language surnames
Italian toponymic surnames